Craig Duncanson (born March 17, 1967) is a Canadian former professional ice hockey left winger. He was drafted in the first round, ninth overall, by the Los Angeles Kings in the 1985 NHL Entry Draft. He played 38 games in the National Hockey League (NHL): 28 over five seasons with the Kings, seven with the Winnipeg Jets in the 1990–91 season, and three with the New York Rangers in the 1992–93 season. Duncanson is currently the head coach for the Sudbury Wolves in the Ontario Hockey League.

Career
Duncanson was born in Sudbury, Ontario and raised in Walden, Ontario. He played junior hockey for the Sudbury Wolves in the Ontario Hockey League (OHL), and was drafted by the National Hockey League (NHL) after his second OHL season by the Los Angeles Kings. Duncanson turned professional in 1986 with two games for the King during the 1985–86 season. While in the Kings' organization, Duncanson played mostly for their American Hockey League (AHL) affiliate New Haven Nighthawks with a few callups to the NHL team. He was traded to the Minnesota North Stars by the Kings for Daniel Berthiaume on September 6, 1990, then flipped by Minnesota to the Winnipeg Jets for Brian Hunt. On May 21, 1991, Duncanson was traded again, this time to the Washington Capitals. Duncanson never played for the Capitals and he signed as a free agent with the New York Rangers on September 4, 1992. Duncanson played three seasons for the Rangers' organization, mostly with the Binghamton Rangers. In 1995, Duncanson left the Rangers organization, signing with the Orlando Solar Bears of the International Hockey League (IHL). Duncanson played three seasons in the IHL before retiring.

Duncanson was the head coach of the Voyageurs men's ice hockey team at Laurentian University, reclaiming the role from 1997 to 2000 and again from 2013 to 2021. In 2021, he was hired by his original OHL team, the Sudbury Wolves, as its head coach.

Career statistics

References

External links

1967 births
Living people
Baltimore Skipjacks players
Binghamton Rangers players
Canadian ice hockey left wingers
Canadian people of Scottish descent
Cincinnati Cyclones (IHL) players
Cornwall Royals (OHL) players
Fort Wayne Komets players
Ice hockey people from Ontario
Sportspeople from Greater Sudbury
Los Angeles Kings draft picks
Los Angeles Kings players
Moncton Hawks players
National Hockey League first-round draft picks
New Haven Nighthawks players
New York Rangers players
Orlando Solar Bears (IHL) players
Sudbury Wolves players
Winnipeg Jets (1979–1996) players